Hilary Dawn La Fontaine (19 October 1937 – 24 September 2012) was a Kenyan-born British intelligence officer and secretary for the Secret Intelligence Service (SIS). The daughter of an army officer and colonial civil servant, she was educated in Kenya before moving to England to train a secretary. La Fontaine joined the SIS in 1967 and undertook her first missions in Africa. She became the personal assistant to the chief of the service in 1974 and later transferred to the SIS's department at the centre of the Cold War to support its operations behind the Iron Curtain. La Fontaine accepted a posting at the British Embassy in Hanoi six years later, becoming the sole regular Western source in Communist Vietnam. She returned to London in 1982 to the posting of the SIS's secretarial branch and retired twelve years later to take up her hobbies and two academical posts.

Biography

Early life and ancestry
La Fontaine was born on 19 October 1937 in Nyeri, Kenya. She was the youngest of three children of army officer and colonial civil servant Sydney Hubert La Fontaine and his wife Honor Kathleen Milton. Sydney fought in both world wars, serving in East Africa during World War I and was stationed in Egypt during World War II. La Fontaine's ancestors were a Huguenot family who had fled to Great Britain following the Edict of Fontainebleau in 1685. They joined the Levant Company shortly afterwards and settled in Constantinople in the 18th century. The family continued to maintain British citizenship and educated their children in England. These historical events may have led to La Fontaine developing a restless sense of adventure. She was educated at the Kenya High School for Girls.

Career
She flew to England to train as a secretary. In 1962 La Fontaine flew to Kinshasa (formerly Léopoldville) to join her sister Jean and her husband John Sackur of the Secret Intelligence Service (SIS) to assist them in a research project. She found herself on the same aircraft months later but was chartered for the head of the Congolese Security Services, Victor Nendaka Bika. La Fontaine discovered that the plane was being used to ferry crates of gold bars. She formally joined the SIS in 1967 as a secretary. La Fontaine used to say the first thought of joining the services originated during a conservation from her Congolese mission five years earlier. When La Fontaine joined the service, it was small and thinly spread with most posts being occupied by an officer with support from a secretary. The method of communication was by morse code and "book and pad cipher", requiring staff to have self-reliance and resourcefulness. Although the SIS was male-dominated, there was a strong mutual trust that largely ignored age and rank and was stemmed from undertaking lonely and demanding jobs, in which the full responsibility went to secretaries.

La Fontaine's first two missions in Africa saw her involved in the post's tasks that included meeting, debriefing and managing clandestine agents. In the Oxford Dictionary of National Biography, Gerald Williams wrote that she had "the right qualities for a role that called for intelligence, common sense, self-reliance, and the ability to impart confidence to those whose safety depended on her" which was made clear that she was "a good field operator." La Fontaine became the personal assistant to the chief of the service in 1974 and learned the about the extent of the SIS's activities. She felt she discovered her niche after a series of unsatisfactory jobs in London and Nairobi and the service agreed. This led to the service to judge La Fontaine's performance as outstanding and she was awarded the MBE in 1976, a rare distinction in the service. She was transferred to the department at the centre of the SIS's activities in the Cold War in support of its difficult and dangerous operations behind the Iron Curtain.

Later career and death
La Fontaine was promoted in 1980, and accepted a post at the British Embassy in Hanoi. She was the sole regular source of Western intelligence inside Communist Vietnam and carried heavy responsibility. La Fontaine's presence made it hugely important for the Central Intelligence Agency (CIA) who greatly valued her reporting and insights in the country, and the agency acknowledged her activities by awarding her the Meritorious Service Medal from the American people, a distinction normally reserved for CIA members. She became the head of the SIS's secretarial branch upon returning to London in 1982. La Fontaine moved up the ladder through her influence brought about by her directness and humanity and her undertaking of appointments in personnel management to the rank of under-secretary.

She graduated from the Open University in 1983 with a Bachelor's degree in humanities. La Fontaine retired in 1994 and moved to Camberwell. La Fontaine pursued her interests in animal welfare, children's education and history. From 1995 and 2000, she served as the chair of governors of John Donne Primary School in Peckham and also worked as a research assistant on the Special Operations Executive's history. La Fontaine died of cancer at St Christopher's Hospice in Sydenham on 24 September 2012. She was unmarried. La Fontaine's funeral was attended by many people of the area in which she lived along with many of her colleagues in the SIS.

References

1937 births
2012 deaths
People from Nyeri County
Secret Intelligence Service personnel
Alumni of the Open University
Members of the Order of the British Empire
Alumni of Kenya High School
20th-century English women
21st-century English women